The Abolish Self Government Coalition was a minor Australian Capital Territory political party that experienced limited success in the early years of the Australian Capital Territory Legislative Assembly. It opposed self government for the ACT, supporting its re-integration into the local government of New South Wales. The party elected one MLA, Dennis Stevenson, to the ACT Legislative Assembly in 1989; he was re-elected in 1991 but retired in 1995, after which the party declined markedly. It was federally registered on 22 December 1992 and deregistered on 16 June 1995.

References

Defunct political parties in the Australian Capital Territory
Political parties established in 1989
Political parties disestablished in 1995
Single-issue political parties
Single-issue political parties in Australia
1989 establishments in Australia
1995 disestablishments in Australia